Mohamed Kourouma (born 12 January 1998) is a Guinean-born Dutch professional footballer who plays for RKSV Groene Ster, as a striker.

External links
 

1998 births
Living people
Guinean footballers
Fortuna Sittard players
Eerste Divisie players
Association football forwards
Guinean expatriate footballers
Guinean expatriate sportspeople in the Netherlands
Expatriate footballers in the Netherlands
RKSV Groene Ster players